Blarg may refer to:
 Blarg, an alien species in the Ratchet & Clank video game series
 Blarg, one of two common words used by the Alien in the web series Red vs. Blue
 Blarg, an alien species in the episode "The Big Dipper Diner" of the animated series The Backyardigans

See also
 Blargh, a musician in the band  Nidingr
 Tales of Blarg, a fanzine by created by Janelle Hessig 
 Blargies